1996 Japanese Super Cup was the Japanese Super Cup competition. The match was played at National Stadium in Tokyo on March 9, 1996. Nagoya Grampus Eight won the championship.

Match details

References

Japanese Super Cup
1996 in Japanese football
Yokohama F. Marinos matches
Nagoya Grampus matches